Events from the year 1919 in Russia

Events

 8th Congress of the Russian Communist Party (Bolsheviks)
 Battle of Berezina (1919)
 Kiev pogroms (1919)
 Suchan Valley Campaign

Births
 August 18 – Evdokia Bobyleva, Russian teacher (d. 2017)
 December 23 – Vasily Reshetnikov, Soviet Air Force pilot

Deaths
 January 27 – Nikolai Iudovich Ivanov, Russian general (b. 1851)
 January 28 –  Grand Duke Dmitry Konstantinovich of Russia (b. 1860)
 March 16 – Yakov Sverdlov, Bolshevik revolutionary and politician (b. 1885)
 April 19 – Andrei Eberhardt, Russian admiral (b. 1856)
 April 20 – Vasili Altfater, Russian and Soviet admiral (b. 1883)
 June 29 – Alexander Ragoza, Russian general and Ukrainian politician (executed) (b. 1858)
 September 16 – Alfred Parland, Russian architect (b. 1842)
 December 16 – Julia Lermontova, Russian chemist (b. 1846)

References

 
Years of the 20th century in Russia